Belgium participated in the Eurovision Song Contest 2003 with the song "Sanomi" written by Yves Barbieux. The song was performed by the group Urban Trad, which was internally selected by the Walloon broadcaster Radio Télévision Belge de la Communauté Française (RTBF) in December 2002 to represent the nation at the 2003 contest in Riga, Latvia. The song, "Sanomi", was presented to the public on 31 March 2003.

Belgium competed in the Eurovision Song Contest which took place on 24 May 2003. Performing during the show in position 22, Belgium placed second out of the 26 participating countries, scoring 165 points. This was Belgium's best result in the contest since their victory in 1986.

Background

In 2002, Sergio and the Ladies represented the country with the song "Sister" and placed thirteenth.

The Belgian broadcaster for the 2003 contest, who broadcasts the event in Belgium and organises the selection process for its entry, was Radio Télévision Belge de la Communauté Française (RTBF). The Belgian participation in the contest alternates between two broadcasters: the Flemish Vlaamse Radio- en Televisieomroeporganisatie (VRT) and the Walloon RTBF. Both broadcasters have selected the Belgian entry using national finals and internal selections in the past. In 2000 and 2002, both RTBF and VRT organised a national final in order to select the Belgian entry. On 18 December 2002, RTBF confirmed Belgium's participation in the 2003 Eurovision Song Contest having internally selected both the artist and song.

Before Eurovision

Internal selection 
The Belgian entry for the 2003 Eurovision Song Contest was selected via an internal selection by RTBF. On 18 December 2002, the broadcaster announced that they had selected the group Urban Trad to represent Belgium in Riga, performing the song "Sanomi" at the contest. The song was written by member of the group, Yves Barbieux, and was performed in imaginary language. "Sanomi" was also the first ever entry at the Eurovision Song Contest that was in imaginary language. On 31 March 2003, RTBF held a press conference in Brussels where the song was presented to the public. The music video for the song, filmed in late March 2003, was released on the same day of the presentation.

Controversy 
Following the announcement of the Belgian entrant, it was revealed by the Belgian State Security Service that one of the members of Urban Trad, Soetkin Collier, had been linked to extreme right wing political groups and has had two criminal records relating to participations in prohibited protests. It was alleged that Collier had also attended a commemorative event in honour of the Nazi leader Rudolf Hess in Antwerp in 1996. Following pressure from local politicians, RTBF announced on 19 February 2003 that Collier would not perform with the group at Eurovision.

At Eurovision 
According to Eurovision rules, all nations with the exceptions of the bottom five countries in the 2002 contest competed in the final on 24 May 2003. On 29 November 2002, a special allocation draw was held which determined the running order and Belgium was set to perform in position 22, following the entry from Latvia and before the entry from Estonia. Belgium finished in second place with 165 points.

The contest was broadcast in Belgium by both the Flemish and Walloon broadcasters. VRT broadcast the show on TV1 with commentary in Dutch by André Vermeulen and Anja Daems. RTBF televised the shows on La Une with commentary in French by Jean-Pierre Hautier. The show was also broadcast by RTBF on La Première with commentary in French by Patrick Duhamel and Sophie Brems, and by VRT on Radio 2 with commentary in Dutch by Julien Put and Michel Follet. The Belgian spokesperson, who announced the Belgian votes during the final, was Corinne Boulangier.

Voting 
Below is a breakdown of points awarded to Belgium and awarded by Belgium in the contest. The nation awarded its 12 points to Turkey in the contest.

References 

2003
Countries in the Eurovision Song Contest 2003